Salvatore Campanella (born 28 October 1969) is an Italian wrestler. He competed in the men's Greco-Roman 90 kg at the 1992 Summer Olympics.

References

External links
 

1969 births
Living people
Italian male sport wrestlers
Olympic wrestlers of Italy
Wrestlers at the 1992 Summer Olympics
Sportspeople from Catania